The Petite rivière du Chêne (in English: Little Oak River) is a tributary of the south shore of the St. Lawrence River, in Quebec, in Canada. This river flows in the municipalities of Notre-Dame-de-Lourdes, Villeroy (MRC de L'Érable Regional County Municipality), Manseau, Fortierville, Parisville and Deschaillons-sur-Saint-Laurent (MRC de Bécancour Regional County Municipality), in the administrative region of Centre-du-Québec.

Geography 
The main neighboring watersheds of the Petite rivière du Chêne are:
 North side: St. Lawrence River;
 East side: L'Esperance stream, rivière au Chêne, rivière aux Ormes, Creuse River, Geoffroy stream;
 South side: Bécancour River;
 West side: St. Lawrence River, rivière aux Orignaux, rivière aux Glaises.

Upper course of the river (segment of )

  west, in Villeroy, to the municipal limit of Manseau (MRC de Bécancour Regional County Municipality);
  west, to highway 20;
  west, up to route 218;
  towards the north-west, winding until it comes back to cross route 218 south of the village of Manseau;
  north-west, winding up to the tenth and 11th rang road;
  north, winding up to the road to rang Saint-Agathe;

Lower course of the river (segment of )

From the confluence of the Creuse River, the Petite rivière du Chêne flows over:
  eastward to its confluence.

The Petite rivière du Chêne flows over the flats of the south shore of the Estuary of Saint Lawrence, at the limit of Deschaillons and Leclercville.

Toponymy 
In the Abenaki language the "little river" is like its "big neighbor" Rivière du Chêne (wachilmezi) like an oak acorn (wachil).

The toponym Petite rivière du Chêne was formalized on December 5, 1968, at the Commission de toponymie du Québec.

See also 
 List of rivers of Quebec

References 

Rivers of Chaudière-Appalaches
Rivers of Centre-du-Québec